Document classification or document categorization is a problem in library science, information science and computer science. The task is to assign a document to one or more classes or categories. This may be done "manually" (or "intellectually") or algorithmically. The intellectual classification of documents has mostly been the province of library science, while the algorithmic classification of documents is mainly in information science and computer science. The problems are overlapping, however, and there is therefore interdisciplinary research on document classification.

The documents to be classified may be texts, images, music, etc. Each kind of document possesses its special classification problems. When not otherwise specified, text classification is implied.

Documents may be classified according to their subjects or according to other attributes (such as document type, author, printing year etc.). In the rest of this article only subject classification is considered. There are two main philosophies of subject classification of documents: the content-based approach and the request-based approach.

"Content-based" versus "request-based" classification
Content-based classification is classification in which the weight given to particular subjects in a document determines the class to which the document is assigned. It is, for example, a common rule for classification in libraries, that at least 20% of the content of a book should be about the class to which the book is assigned. In automatic classification it could be the number of times given words appears in a document.

Request-oriented classification (or -indexing) is classification in which the anticipated request from users is influencing how documents are being classified. The classifier asks themself: “Under which descriptors should this entity be found?” and “think of all the possible queries and decide for which ones the entity at hand is relevant” (Soergel, 1985, p. 230).

Request-oriented classification may be classification that is targeted towards a particular audience or user group. For example, a library or a database for feminist studies may classify/index documents differently when compared to a historical library.  It is probably better, however, to understand request-oriented classification as policy-based classification: The classification is done according to some ideals and reflects the purpose of the library or database doing the classification. In this way it is not necessarily a kind of classification or indexing based on user studies. Only if empirical data about use or users are applied should request-oriented classification be regarded as a user-based approach.

Classification versus indexing
Sometimes a distinction is made between assigning documents to classes ("classification") versus assigning subjects to documents ("subject indexing") but as Frederick Wilfrid Lancaster has argued, this distinction is not fruitful. "These terminological distinctions,” he writes, “are quite meaningless and only serve to cause confusion” (Lancaster, 2003, p. 21). The view that this distinction is purely superficial is also supported by the fact that a classification system may be transformed into a thesaurus and vice versa (cf., Aitchison, 1986, 2004; Broughton, 2008; Riesthuis & Bliedung, 1991). Therefore, the act of labeling a document (say by assigning a term from a controlled vocabulary to a document) is at the same time to assign that document to the class of documents indexed by that term (all documents indexed or classified as X belong to the same class of documents). In other words, labeling a document is the same as assigning it to the class of documents indexed under that label.

Automatic document classification (ADC)
Automatic document classification tasks can be divided into three sorts: supervised document classification where some external mechanism (such as human feedback) provides information on the correct classification for documents, unsupervised document classification (also known as document clustering), where the classification must be done entirely without reference to external information, and semi-supervised document classification, where parts of the documents are labeled by the external mechanism. There are several software products under various license models available.

Techniques 
Automatic document classification techniques include:

 Artificial neural network
 Concept Mining
 Decision trees such as ID3 or C4.5
 Expectation maximization (EM)
 Instantaneously trained neural networks
 Latent semantic indexing
 Multiple-instance learning
 Naive Bayes classifier
 Natural language processing approaches
 Rough set-based classifier
 Soft set-based classifier
 Support vector machines (SVM)
 K-nearest neighbour algorithms
 tf–idf

Applications 
Classification techniques have been applied to
 spam filtering, a process which tries to discern E-mail spam messages from legitimate emails
 email routing, sending an email sent to a general address to a specific address or mailbox depending on topic
 language identification, automatically determining the language of a text
 genre classification, automatically determining the genre of a text
 readability assessment, automatically determining the degree of readability of a text, either to find suitable materials for different age groups or reader types or as part of a larger text simplification system
 sentiment analysis, determining the attitude of a speaker or a writer with respect to some topic or the overall contextual polarity of a document.
 health-related classification using social media in public health surveillance 
 article triage, selecting articles that are relevant for manual literature curation, for example as is being done as the first step to generate manually curated annotation databases in biology

See also 

 Categorization
 Classification (disambiguation)
 Compound term processing
 Concept-based image indexing
 Content-based image retrieval
 Decimal section numbering
 Document
 Document retrieval
 Document clustering
 Information retrieval
 Knowledge organization
 Knowledge Organization System
 Library classification
 Machine learning
 Native Language Identification
 String metrics
 Subject (documents)
 Subject indexing
 Supervised learning, unsupervised learning
 Text mining, web mining, concept mining

References

Further reading 
 Fabrizio Sebastiani. Machine learning in automated text categorization. ACM Computing Surveys, 34(1):1–47, 2002.
 Stefan Büttcher, Charles L. A. Clarke, and Gordon V. Cormack. Information Retrieval: Implementing and Evaluating Search Engines . MIT Press, 2010.

External links 
 Introduction to document classification
 Bibliography on Automated Text Categorization
 Bibliography on Query Classification
 Text Classification analysis page
 Learning to Classify Text - Chap. 6 of the book Natural Language Processing with Python (available online)
 TechTC - Technion Repository of Text Categorization Datasets
 David D. Lewis's Datasets
 BioCreative III ACT (article classification task) dataset

Data mining
Information science
Knowledge representation
Machine learning
Natural language processing